is a Japanese manga artist. Among his most famous works is the science fiction series Spirit of Wonder, which has been adapted into an anime series and brought him much acclaim.

Profile
During his formative years in university as a student of optical science, Tsuruta, who had initially wanted to be a photographer, had been inspired by the works of numerous science fiction authors, such as Robert A. Heinlein, and manga artists, such as Yukinobu Hoshino and his manga Sabertooth Tiger, which had inspired him to create manga. He has also cited Tetsuya Chiba and his manga among his inspirations.

Soon after graduating, he wrote numerous dōjinshi and was an assistant to numerous manga artists, prior to making his debut as a professional manga artist. In 1986, Tsuruta made his professional debut, authoring his first manga series, the short work, which was serialized in Kodansha's Weekly Morning seinen magazine, set in a world where the land was sinking into water. Tsuruta has cited that the inspiration to this debut work of his came during a train journey from Tokyo to the ocean at Odawara, during which he had seen numerous rice paddies and thought of the possibility of a train line passing through the ocean, after which he wanted to create a work where he could use this image.

Soon after, Tsuruta authored Spirit of Wonder, among his most famous works, in which he applied many of his inspirations, which was serialized in Kodansha's seinen magazines Weekly Morning and Afternoon between 1987 and 1996, and was later adapted into an anime series.

After Spirit of Wonder, Tsuruta wrote short manga works, and also illustrated numerous art books, which were quite successful. In 2002, he provided the character designs for the anime series Abenobashi Mahō Shōtengai and also illustrated its manga adaptation.

In 2000 and 2001, Tsuruta received the 31st and 32nd Seiun Awards for outstanding artist of the year. He has also received the Hayakawa Award for best illustrator, in 2000.

Works

Tankōbon
 Spirit of Wonder (serialized in Morning and Afternoon, 1986–1995)
 
 Magical Shopping Arcade Abenobashi (character designs, illustrator of manga)
 Forget-me-not
 
 ; original story: Shinji Kajio
 
 La Pomme Prisonnière (ポム・プリゾニエール, 2014)

Artbooks
 
 Eternal

Other works
 The Sky Crawlers (illustrations)

References

External links
 Scientific Boys Club (certified fansite)
 https://web.archive.org/web/20001022104154/http://www.gainax.co.jp/special/tsuruta/tsuruta-e.html

1961 births
Manga artists from Shizuoka Prefecture
People from Hamamatsu
Japanese illustrators
Living people